The Battery "G" 1st Michigan Light Artillery Regiment was an artillery battery that served in the Union Army during the American Civil War.

Service
Battery "G"  was organized at Kalamazoo, Michigan and mustered into service on  January 17, 1862.

The battery was mustered out on August 6, 1865.

Total strength and casualties
Over its existence, the battery carried a total of 320 men on its muster rolls.

The battery lost 4 enlisted men killed in action or mortally wounded and 1 officer and 41 enlisted men who died of disease, for a total of 46
fatalities.

Commanders
Captain Charles H. Lamphere

See also
List of Michigan Civil War Units
Michigan in the American Civil War

Notes

References
The Civil War Archive

Artillery
1865 disestablishments in Michigan
Artillery units and formations of the American Civil War
1862 establishments in Michigan
Military units and formations established in 1862
Military units and formations disestablished in 1865